The Zimbabwe Youth in Alliance (ZYA) is a political party in Zimbabwe. 
After the last legislative elections, 31 March 2005, the party remained without parliamentary representation.

Political parties in Zimbabwe